Forsythe Covered Bridge, also known as Forsythe Mill Bridge, is a historic covered bridge located near Rushville, Indiana and/or Gowdy, in Orange Township, Rush County, Indiana. It was built in 1888 by Emmett L. Kennedy. The bridge has rounded arch portals and decorative scrollwork that are signatures of the Kennedy firm.

The bridge was listed on the U.S. National Register of Historic Places in 1983, as part of a multiple property submission covering six bridges built by the Kennedy family firm.

See also
List of bridges documented by the Historic American Engineering Record in Indiana

References

External links

Covered bridges on the National Register of Historic Places in Indiana
Bridges completed in 1888
Bridges in Rush County, Indiana
Historic American Engineering Record in Indiana
National Register of Historic Places in Rush County, Indiana
Road bridges on the National Register of Historic Places in Indiana
Wooden bridges in Indiana
Burr Truss bridges in the United States